Internationella Engelska Gymnasiet Södermalm, also known as the International English Gymnasium Södermalm, is a secondary school located in Södermalm, Sweden. The institute offers four Swedish national programmes and the International Baccalaureate (IB) programme, which qualify students for university studies in Sweden or abroad.

Most courses (except Swedish, Civics A, Law and Modern Languages) are taught in English language. Most of the teachers are native English speakers recruited from USA, Canada, United Kingdom and other English-speaking countries. Nearly 25% of the current teaching staff have PhDs in their fields; and the majority of the staff have master's degrees and qualified teacher-status. Currently there are eighty staff members working at IEGS.

The school is free of charge for the students. The education is paid for by the national voucher system.

At IEGS a house system has been introduced and adapted from the British model. Teachers and students are assigned to a house, which forms the basis for group activities, mentor time, assemblies and competitions. Currently, IEGS has four houses: King House, Russel House, Pavlov House and Curie House.

References

Gymnasiums (school) in Sweden
Schools in Stockholm
International Baccalaureate schools in Sweden